Britta Alice Holmberg (21 December 1921 – 3 June 2004) was a Swedish actress. She appeared in 18 films between 1942 and 1973. She was married to actor Stig Olin (they eventually divorced), and is the mother of actress Lena Olin.

Filmography

External links 
 

1921 births
2004 deaths
20th-century Swedish actresses
People from Eskilstuna Municipality
Swedish film actresses